The Solar Challenger was a solar-powered electric aircraft designed by Paul MacCready's AeroVironment. The aircraft was designed as an improvement on the Gossamer Penguin, which in turn was a solar-powered variant of the human-powered Gossamer Albatross. It was powered entirely by the photovoltaic cells on its wing and stabilizer, without even reserve batteries, and was the first such craft capable of long-distance flight. In 1981, it successfully completed a 163-mile (262 km) demonstration flight from France to England.

History
The Solar Challenger was designed by a team  led by Paul MacCready as a more airworthy improvement on the Gossamer Penguin, directly incorporating lessons learned from flight testing the earlier aircraft. As with the Gossamer Penguin, construction was sponsored by DuPont in exchange for publicity for the company's patented materials incorporated in the design. AstroFlight, Inc. supplied the motors and solar panels, designed by Robert Boucher. The plane's wings carried 16,128 solar cells yielding a maximum solar power of 3,800 watts. It was flight tested in Western USA in winter 1980-1981.

On July 7, 1981, the aircraft flew 163 miles from Pontoise – Cormeilles Aerodrome, north of Paris, France to Manston Royal Air Force Base in Manston, United Kingdom, staying aloft 5 hours and 23 minutes, with pilot Stephen Ptacek at the controls. Currently the plane is owned by the Smithsonian Institution's Air and Space Museum.

Design
The Solar Challenger was designed to be sturdier, more powerful, and more maneuverable than the Gossamer Penguin so as to be able to withstand sustained high-altitude flight and normal turbulence. It was over three times as heavy (without pilot) as the Gossamer Penguin and had a shorter wingspan, but was proportionately more powerful, with electricity supplied by 16,128 solar cells powering two three-horsepower motors. The solar panels were directly affixed to the wing and large horizontal stabilizer, both of which had to be flat on top to accommodate them. The two motors, each 3 inches wide and 17 inches long and incorporating samarium-cobalt permanent magnets, operated in tandem on a common shaft to drive a single, controllable-pitch propeller. The design incorporated advanced synthetic materials with very high strength to weight ratios, including Kevlar, Nomex, Delrin, Teflon, and Mylar, all supplied by the aircraft's sponsor, Dupont.

Specifications

See also

References

External links

Solar Challenger Gallery Gallery of photographs of Solar Challenger by Don Monroe
UAS Advanced Development: Solar Challenger Aerovironment page on Solar Challenger (some info now out-of-date)
Video, hosted by San Diego Air & Space Museum

Solar-powered aircraft
1980s United States experimental aircraft
1981 in aviation
AeroVironment aircraft
Photovoltaics
Single-engined tractor aircraft
High-wing aircraft
Aircraft first flown in 1980